Stars and Stripes Vol. 1 is the 28th studio album by American rock band the Beach Boys, released on August 19, 1996, by River North Records. Produced by Joe Thomas and Brian Wilson, Stars and Stripes is a collaborative album between the Beach Boys and various country acts.

The idea for the album was conceived by Thomas, who was then the owner of River North Records. According to Wilson's wife Melinda, during the album's recording, "They [the Beach Boys] treated [Brian] like an invalid, all the time saying, 'Do this, don't do that, are you okay?'"

In music critic Stephen Thomas Erlewine's description, the release was "an unmitigated disaster and an outright embarrassment for all involved". The album's failure prevented Brian from securing a record contract, leaving his highly anticipated recording collaborations with Andy Paley in limbo. A planned second volume never materialized, and Stars and Stripes became the last studio album to feature Carl Wilson, who died in 1998.

Track listing

Personnel
Credits from album liner notes.

The Beach Boys
Al Jardine – harmony and backing vocals
Bruce Johnston – harmony and backing vocals
Mike Love – harmony and backing vocals, additional vocals on “Long Tall Texan,” executive producer
Brian Wilson – harmony and backing vocals, producer
Carl Wilson – harmony and backing vocals except “Long Tall Texan”

Special guests
 Lorrie Morgan – lead vocals on “Don’t Worry Baby”
 James House – lead vocals on “Little Deuce Coupe”
 Junior Brown – lead vocals and slide "guit–steel" on "409"
 Doug Supernaw – lead vocals on “Long Tall Texan”
 Mark Miller of Sawyer Brown – lead vocals on “I Get Around”
 Toby Keith – lead vocals on “Be True To Your School”
 Ricky Van Shelton – lead vocals on “Fun, Fun, Fun”
 T. Graham Brown – lead vocals on “Help Me, Rhonda”
 Willie Nelson – lead vocals and possible acoustic guitar on “The Warmth of the Sun”
 Colin Raye – lead vocals on “Sloop John B”
 Kathy Troccoli – lead vocals on “I Can Hear Music”
 Timothy B. Schmit – lead and additional backing vocals on “Caroline, No”

Additional musicians

Charts
Album

Singles

References

Bibliography

External links

The Beach Boys albums
1996 albums
Country albums by American artists
Albums arranged by Jimmy Webb
Albums produced by Brian Wilson
Vocal duet albums
River North Records albums
Covers albums
Country pop albums